Tilda Cobham-Hervey (born 1994) is an Australian actress from Adelaide, South Australia, with a background in circus and physical theatre. In 2014 Cobham-Hervey made her film debut at the age of 19 in 52 Tuesdays, a critically acclaimed independent film directed by Sophie Hyde, and has also appeared on stage. She appeared in the 2018 film Hotel Mumbai, and starred as feminist icon Helen Reddy in the 2019 biopic I Am Woman.

Early life
Starting from the age of nine, Cobham-Hervey trained and performed in the Adelaide-based youth circus performance troupe Cirkidz for seven years, and was involved in five major productions. When Cobham-Hervey performed in the circus, her specialities were hula hoop, trapeze and acrobatic pitching, but the emphasis was theatrical, and the focus was on storytelling.

Tilly also has a younger brother called Huey.

She attended Marryatville High School. In 2009, Cobham-Hervey became a founding member of an Adelaide circus group called Gravity and Other Myths where she co-devised a show called Freefall, which won the Adelaide Fringe's "Best Circus" award in 2010, the festival's Tour Ready award in 2011 and later that year won "Best Circus" in the Melbourne Fringe Festival, and she won the festival's award for "Best Emerging Circus/Physical Theatre Performer" in 2011. Cobham-Hervey also performed with Force Majeure in The Age I’m In, a show which was part of the 2008 Sydney and Adelaide festivals, and toured to 17 regional cities in Australia, and toured in Ireland, Canada and Korea.

Career
Cobham-Hervey played the lead role of Billie in Closer Productions' feature film 52 Tuesdays from August 2011 to August 2012. After 52 Tuesdays was released at the Sundance Film Festival, Cobham-Hervey was signed by Creative Artists Agency (CAA), a major talent agency in the United States, and by United Management in Australia.

In 2012, Cobham-Hervey played the supporting role in Projector Films' feature One Eyed Girl. In 2013 she created and performed the front-of-house entertainment at the Adelaide Festival club, Barrio, and in 2014, starred in the "Find Wonderful" television commercial for the re-launch of the Myer brand, filmed in New Zealand over three days.

In 2016, Cobham-Hervey appeared in her first play as Rosie Price in Things I Know To be True, which was written by Andrew Bovell for a co-production between State Theatre Company of South Australia and UK's Frantic Assembly.

Cobham-Hervey played the role of Kitty in the six-part TV series Fucking Adelaide, which premiered at the Adelaide Film Festival in October 2017 and screened on ABC national television as well as iview from 2018 (still available ).

Cobham-Hervey's directorial debut, a short film commissioned by the ABC and Screen Australia as part of the ABC ME Girls Initiative, premiered simultaneously at the 2017 Adelaide Film Festival and on ABC ME on 11 October 2017, the UN's International Day of the Girl. Made by Sophie Hyde's Closer Productions in Adelaide, A Field Guide to Being a 12-Year-Old Girl was awarded the Crystal Bear for Best Short Film by the Youth Jury of the 68th Berlin International Film Festival's Generation KPlus Section in February 2018. It is available on ABC iview until June 2019.

She played the role of Nanny Sally in the major film Hotel Mumbai, released in 2019.

In December 2017, she was cast as Australian singer Helen Reddy in Australian film-maker Unjoo Moon's bio-pic about the singer Helen Reddy, I Am Woman. Filmed in Australia, Los Angeles and New York City in late 2018, the film premiered at the Toronto Film Festival in 2019. Her performance was lauded by The Hollywood Reporter, describing it as a "breakout performance".

Cobham-Hervey and Dev Patel co-wrote and -directed a short film, Roborovski, about a hamster, which premiered at Flickerfest in Sydney in January 2020. The film won three prizes at the Rencontres Internationales du Cinéma des Antipodes (Antipodean Film Festival) at Saint Tropez, France, in 2021: Australian Short Film Today; the Nicholas Baudin Prize; and the Audience Award.

In 2021, Cobham-Hervey devised an interactive theatre piece entitled Two Strangers Walk into a Bar which was premiered in the Adelaide Fringe and had a later season at MOD., a South Australian "futuristic museum of discovery".

 Cobham-Hervey had relocated back to Australia, after around four years in Los Angeles, to film The Lost Flowers Of Alice Hart.

Filmography

Film

Television

Writing and directing

Theatre

Awards and nominations

Circus and physical theatre

Film and television

Acting awards

Directing awards

Roborovski won three prizes at the Rencontres Internationales du Cinéma des Antipodes in 2021: Australian Short Film Today; the Nicholas Baudin Prize; and the Audience Award.

Stage (theatre)

Personal life
Cobham-Hervey's father is set and lighting designer and event director Geoff Cobham, and her mother is dance teacher and former dancer Roz Hervey.

In March 2017, Cobham-Hervey's relationship with British actor Dev Patel became public. They met nine months earlier on the set of Hotel Mumbai.

References

Further reading

External links

Living people
Actresses from Adelaide
21st-century Australian actresses
Australian film actresses
1994 births